Hugo Ott (20 August 1931 – 22 January 2022) was a German historian and academic.

Biography
Ott earned a doctoral degree in 1959 with a thesis on the history of Saint Blaise Abbey in the Black Forest. From 1972 to 1997, he was chair of economic and social history at the University of Freiburg. He held discussions with pastor , who talked of the inequity within concentration camps between clergy and their fellow prisoners.

Ott died in Merzhausen on 22 January 2022, at the age of 90.

Works
Studien zur Geschichte des Klosters St. Blasien im hohen und späten Mittelalter (1963)
Die Vogtei über das Kloster St. Blasien seit dem Aussterben der Zähringer bis zum Übergang an das Haus Habsburg (1965)
Die Klostergrundherrschaft St. Blasien im Mittelalter. Beiträge zur Besitzgeschichte (1969)
Hans Filbinger. Der „Fall“ und die Fakten (1980)
Wirtschafts-Ploetz. Die Wirtschaftsgeschichte zum Nachschlagen (1985)
Martin Heidegger. Unterwegs zu seiner Biographie (1988)
Martin Heidegger: A Political Life (1994)
Annäherungen an Martin Heidegger. Festschrift für Hugo Ott zum 65. Geburtstag (1996)
Geschichte in Verantwortung. Festschrift für Hugo Ott zum 65. Geburtstag (1996)
Laubhüttenfest 1940 (2007)

References

1931 births
2022 deaths
20th-century German historians
Heidegger scholars
Historians of Nazism
Cartellverband members
University of Freiburg alumni
Academic staff of the University of Freiburg
People from Lauda-Königshofen